Rialto is a 2019 Irish/British drama film directed by Peter Mackie Burns and written by Mark O'Halloran. The film stars Tom Vaughan-Lawlor.

The film premiered at the 2019 Venice Film Festival in the Horizons section. It also played at the Goteborg Film Festival in 2020.

Plot
Colm is a 46-year-old married man who has spent his life working on Dublin's docks. While he deals with the death of his father and the loss of his job due to a corporate take-over he explores his sexuality with 19-year-old male hustler Jay. Meanwhile, his family life comes under increasing strain.

Cast 
Tom Vaughan-Lawlor as Colm
Tom Glynn-Carney as Jay
Monica Dolan as Claire
Sophie Jo Wasson Kerry
Scott Graham as Shane
Michael Smiley as Noel
Eileen Walsh as Paula Grainger

References

External links
 
 

2019 films
2019 drama films
British drama films
Irish drama films
Films set in Dublin (city)
2019 LGBT-related films
Irish LGBT-related films
British LGBT-related films
LGBT-related drama films
2010s English-language films
2010s British films